Bardin is an unincorporated community in Putnam County, Florida, United States, located northwest of the city of Palatka. It was named after Hazard Bardin (1856-1934) circa 1900. He was the first resident and operated a turpentine distillery business at the interception of Bardin Road and the creek.

References 

Unincorporated communities in Putnam County, Florida
Unincorporated communities in Florida